Palali or Palaly may refer to :

 Palali, Gujarat, a village on Saurashtra peninsula, Gujarat, western India 
 Palali State, a former princely state with seat in the above town

 Palaly, Sri Lanka, a Sri Lankan town with 
 Palaly Military Base, in the above town
 Palaly (of Jaffna) airport, serving Jaffna city